The US Commercial Real Estate Index ("CREI") is designed to demonstrate the relative strength of the US Commercial Real Estate market. The index is composed of eight economic drivers and is calculated weekly.

The economic drivers behind the CREI are isolated into sub-indices that include the Employment Index, Commercial Real Estate Price Index, Credit Index, Consumer Confidence Index, Housing Index, Inflation Index, Income Index and the Retail Index.

In total, there are over 60 inputs in the US Commercial Real Estate Index all of which come from publicly released data. Most of these come from public sources that are listed below.
 ADP
 Bureau of Economic Analysis (BEA)
 The Conference Board
 Federal Housing Finance Authority (FHFA)
 Federal Reserve
 Mortgage Bankers Association
 Mortgage Market Survey
 National Association of Real Estate Investment Trusts (NAREIT)
 National Association of Realtors (NAR)
 New York Stock Exchange
 University of Michigan
 United States Census Bureau
 United States Department of Labor
 United States Treasury

References

External links
 Commercial property
 Index (economics)
 House price index
 Real estate appraisal
 Real estate pricing

Real estate indices
Commercial real estate
Real estate in the United States